Louis Raymond Aguiar (born June 30, 1966) is a former American football punter. In his career, he played for the Barcelona Dragons (1991) of the World League of American Football, the New York Jets(1991–1993), the Kansas City Chiefs (1994–1998), the Green Bay Packers (1999), and the Chicago Bears (2000) of the NFL. He attended Utah State University but did not graduate.

After his playing days Agular coached for 12 years at Waterloo High School and Seckman Highschool

Aguiar is divorcing Teri Bollinger, a former Miss Illinois Teen USA 1990 and Miss Missouri USA 1999. She is also a former contestant on The Biggest Loser, Season 18. 

He was named as the New York Jets assistant special teams coach on February 5, 2013.

References 

1966 births
American football punters
Chicago Bears players
Green Bay Packers players
Kansas City Chiefs players
Living people
New York Jets players
Utah State Aggies football players
People from Livermore, California
Barcelona Dragons players
Players of American football from California
Sportspeople from Alameda County, California